The Sawankhalok Line is a branch railway line which splits from Chiang Mai Main Line at Ban Dara Junction, and ends at Sawankhalok. There are three stations on the line: Ban Dara Junction, Khlong Maphlap, Sawankhalok.

History

Timeline

Services

Stations

See also
 Chiang Mai Main Line

References

External links
 Sawankhalok Line at Rot Fai Thai Dot Com

Railway lines in Thailand
Sukhothai province
Metre gauge railways in Thailand